"Ain't No More Cane on This Brazos" is a traditional prison work song of the Southern United States. The title refers to work assigned to prisoners sentenced to hard labor in Texas. The labor involved cutting sugar cane along the banks of the Brazos River, where many of the state's prison farms were located in the late nineteenth and early twentieth centuries.

It has been recorded by Alan Lomax on his 1958 recording Texas Folk Songs Sung by Alan Lomax as "Ain't No More Cane on This Brazis", Odetta, Lonnie Donegan, the Limeliters on their album 14 14K Folksongs (1963), Son Volt on the album A Retrospective: 1995-2000, and The Band on the album Across the Great Divide. Bob Dylan also performed the song live in the early 1960s and his version is on multiple bootleg recordings taken from The Gaslight Cafe. An extensive set of lyrics to the song, as sung by inmates of Central State Farm near Houston, Texas, appears in folklorist John Lomax's book American Ballads and Folk Songs, originally published in 1934. Lomax collected another version of the song in a recording of a performance by Ernest Williams and James (Iron Head) Baker; the recording appears on the Document Records album Field Recordings, Vol. 6: Texas (1933-1958).

The song is sometimes attributed to Huddie Ledbetter (Lead Belly), but a recording of him singing the song is obscure or non-existent. A song titled "Ain't No More Cane on this Brazos" does not appear in the extensive discography of Leadbelly recordings contained in Charles Wolfe and Kip Lornell's book The Life and Legend of Leadbelly. Alan Lomax suggests, in the notes for his recording, another source from the Texas prison community.  Possibly the song became associated with Leadbelly through his various recordings of another Texas prison song titled "Go Down, Ol' Hannah" which shares some verses with "Ain't No More Cane on this Brazos".

In 2006, Band of Heathens with their distinctive arrangement included it on their Live at Momo's album. In 2007 Lyle Lovett released two versions of the tune on his album It's Not Big, It's Large. On February 16, 2008, Lovett and John Hiatt performed the song live at the Ulster Performing Arts Center in Kingston, New York, along with The Band's Garth Hudson. On February 14, 2013, Lovett also performed this song with friend Robert Earl Keen at Rudder Auditorium on the campus of their Alma mater, Texas A&M University.

"Ain't No More Cane" is featured in the film Festival Express, where Rick Danko, Janis Joplin, John "Marmaduke" Dawson, Jerry Garcia, Bob Weir, and various other musicians drunkenly sing it while on the train going to the next concert on the tour.

The song, as "Ain't No More Cane on the Brazos", was also covered by the singer Ian Gillan of Deep Purple fame for his 1990 solo-album Naked Thunder. The Chad Mitchell Trio recorded the song on their 1963 album Singin' our Mind. Other covers include The Black Crowes. Chris Smither also covered "No More Cane on the Brazos" on his 1998 CD "Happier Blue". Bill Staines recorded the song on his 1975 album Miles.
It was also covered by Lonnie Donnegan in 1958 and by Canadian band Crowbar on Larger than Life (And Live'r than You've Ever Been) (1971, Daffodil 2-SBA-16007) (recorded in concert at Massey Hall, Toronto, Ontario, Canada). A version of this song is also recorded by The Wood Brothers on their live album Live Vol.2 Nail & Tooth. The song's lyric "Captain don't you do me like you done poor old Shine" was the inspiration for Poor Old Shine, the previous band name for the band Parsonsfield.
The song has also been covered by the band, The Magpie Salute, consisting of former Black Crowes members Rich Robinson, Marc Ford, and Sven Pipien. It can be found on their mostly live debut album, "The Magpie Salute".

Lyrics
The lyrics to The Band's version, which are often attributed to Leadbelly, are as follows:

Ain't no more cane on the Brazos
It's all been ground down to molasses

You shoulda been on the river in 1910
They were driving the women just like they drove the men.

Go down Old Hannah, don'cha rise no more
Don't you rise up til Judgement Day's for sure

Ain't no more cane on the Brazos
It's all been ground down to molasses

Captain don't you do me like you done poor old Shine
Well ya drove that bully til he went stone blind

Wake up on a lifetime, hold up your own head
Well you may get a pardon and then you might drop dead

Ain't no more cane on the Brazos
It's all been ground down to molasses.

References

External links
 Ground Down to Molasses: The Making of an American Folk Song

The Band songs
Bob Dylan songs